Lahouari Touil (born September 15, 1991) is an Algerian footballer who plays as a striker for Saudi Arabian club Al-Ain.

Club career
Lahouari Touil started his football career with CRB Ain Turk after which Touil moved to WA Tlemcen where he played for three seasons And his first match was on September 10, 2011 against AS Khroub and participated as a substitute, as for his first goal was against JS Kabylie on October 1, which was the winning goal. although he was a key player in most matches he was not convinced. after that Touil moved to ASM Oran in Ligue 1 but only played 6 matches including two as a starter, Then he fell back in the level where reached to play in the Ligue Nationale du Football Amateur for two seasons with USM Annaba, to regain some of his luster by returning to Ligue 2 from Amal Bou Saâda gate. and then to Ligue 1 with the team in which WA Tlemcen starred and achieved great results by scoring 10 goals, On September 2, Lahouari Touil moved to the Iraqi club Al-Zawraa SC becoming the first Algerian to play there. His first match was in the Iraqi Super Cup against Al-Quwa Al-Jawiya, where Touil won the first title in its history. As for the first match in the Iraqi Premier League, it was against Al-Sinaa SC and he scored the winning goal.

On 8 September 2022, Touil joined Saudi club Al-Ain.

Career statistics

Club

Honours

Club
 Al-Zawraa SC
 Iraqi Super Cup (1): 2021

References

External links
 

1991 births
Living people
Algerian footballers
Algerian Ligue Professionnelle 1 players
Algerian Ligue 2 players
Iraqi Premier League players
Saudi First Division League players
Association football forwards
WA Tlemcen players
ASM Oran players
USM Annaba players
Amal Bou Saâda players
USM Bel Abbès players
Al-Zawraa SC players
Al-Ain FC (Saudi Arabia) players
Algerian expatriate footballers
Expatriate footballers in Iraq
Expatriate footballers in Saudi Arabia
Algerian expatriate sportspeople in Saudi Arabia
21st-century Algerian people